The Alberti family was a major political and noble family in Florence, allies of the Medicis, with trading agencies across Europe.

History 
The Alberti originated from the castle of Catenaia in Valdarno Casentinese, whence the presence of two chains (Italian: catena) in their coat of arms. They became established in Florence during the 13th century with judge Rustico Alberti and divided into different lines, who owned several houses and towers  near the modern Ponte alle Grazie. Due to their Guelph allegiance, they were exiled after the Battle of Montaperti, but returned after Manfred of Sicily's defeat in the battle of Benevento (1266). They subsequently sided for the Black Guelph faction, and established a flourishing trade company with agencies at Bologna, Genoa, Venice, Barcelona, Paris, Ghent, Brussels, Bruges and London, as well as in Syria and Greece.

In 1378, the Alberti were again banned for their support of the Ciompi revolt.  Some of them were admitted in the Venetian nobility late in the century. Returned to Florence, in the 15th century they were first allied to the Medici against the Albizzi. Main members of the period include writer Antonio Alberti, cardinal Alberto di Giovanni Alberti and architect and Renaissance theorist Leon Battista Alberti.

The family's importance decreased after the creation of the Grand Duchy of Tuscany in the 16th century. The main lineage died during the Victorian Era, and their lands passed on to in-laws. After numerous legal battles, the blood-related Alberti branch of the family recovered several properties.

See also
Palazzo Malenchini Alberti
Torre degli Alberti

Families of Florence